The Lion's Roar is the second studio album by Swedish folk duo First Aid Kit. It was produced by Mike Mogis and features contributions from Bright Eyes' Conor Oberst, Nate Walcott, and The Felice Brothers. The album was released on 18 January 2012.

Reception

Critical
The Lion's Roar received general acclaim from music journalists. The album holds an aggregate score of 81 out of 100 on Metacritic, which indicates "universal acclaim". Rebecca Nicholson of The Guardian commented that it was "a bigger, better record than their debut, rounded out with the confidence of maturity and a smooth, assured indie-country sound." Helen Clarke of musicOMH was similarly positive, stating that "this follow-up could be the album that sees them nudge the likes of Laura Marling and Mumford and Sons out of the way in order to claim a place at the top table." As with the band's previous work, critics praised Klara and Johanna Söderberg's singing, with The Independent highlighting the band's "clear, characterful voices, employed in beautifully modulated, bell-like harmonies."

The album was reissued in the form of a special edition box set on 17 September 2012, featuring additional tracks and a music-video DVD amongst other items.

Rolling Stone named the song "Emmylou" the 10th best song of 2012 and 96th in their list of 100 best songs of the 2010s. At the 2013 annual Grammis Awards, the album won three awards, including album of the year, pop of the year and best album composers of the year.

Commercial
The album went straight to #1 in Sweden in its first week of release, topping the Swedish Albums Chart. It also reached #35 in its first week on the UK Albums Chart,  and has sold 76,759 copies in the UK as of June 2014.

Worldwide, the album has sold over 250,000 copies.

Track listing
All tracks written by Klara and Johanna Söderberg, except where noted.

Official videos

Notes
During the second episode of the Dontnod Entertainment's 2019 video game Life Is Strange 2, one of the characters covered the song "I Found a Way". The original version of the song is featured in the end credits of that episode.
Bluegrass duo Darin and Brooke Aldridge covered "Emmylou" for their 2019 album Inner Journey.

Credits
Keyboards, autoharp, vocals – Johanna Söderberg
Vocals, guitar – Klara Söderberg
Bass guitar – Benkt Söderberg (Cuts 1, 3, 4, 6, 7, 8, 10)
Drums, percussion – Mattias Bergqvist (Cuts 1–8; 10)
Orchestral arrangements - Nate Walcott
Piano – Nate Walcott (Cuts 4–7)
Trumpet – Nate Walcott (Cut 10)
B3 organ – Nate Walcott (Cut 9)
Piano – Ben Brodin (Cuts 1–3; 7)
Accordion – James Felice (Cut 10)
Vocals – Conor Oberst (Cut 10)
Engineer, mixing and producer; mandolin, pedal steel, percussion, claps, vibes, autoharp, electric guitar, hammer dulcimer – Mike Mogis

Charts and certifications

Weekly charts

Year-end charts

Certifications

References

2012 albums
First Aid Kit (band) albums
Wichita Recordings albums
Albums produced by Mike Mogis